The Penang Ferry Service is the oldest ferry service within the State of Penang, Malaysia, connecting the city of George Town on Penang Island and Butterworth on the mainland. This cross-strait transit has been operational since 1894, making it the oldest ferry service in Malaysia. Its fleet of six ferries carries both passengers and automobiles across the Penang Strait daily; each roll-on/roll-off ferry could accommodate cars either on its lower deck or on both decks.

The first cross-strait ferry service between Penang Island and the mainland began in 1894. This regular service was initiated by Quah Beng Kee, an entrepreneur from Penang Island together with his 4 brothers forming a company named Beng Brothers.  Originally a passenger-only service, the ferries were later refitted to carry automobiles in 1925. From 1924, the ferries were operated by the Penang Port Commission (formerly Penang Harbour Board), through its subsidiary, Penang Port Sdn Bhd.

In 2017, the Malaysian federal government began transferring the ferry service from Penang Port Sdn Bhd to Prasarana Malaysia, a government-owned entity which manages urban public transportation across Malaysia. Following the handover, the ferry service has been rebranded as Rapid Ferry. On 31 December 2020, Rapid Ferry ended its service after 3 years.

In 2021, Penang Port Sdn Bhd, which took over the ferry service from Prasarana Malaysia Bhd, began operating fast passenger boats between the mainland and the island, while one of the iconic ferries, Pulau Angsa, was used to transport only motorcycles and bicycles.

Ferry fleet 

The seven ferries in the current fleet and ten retired ferries are named after islands in Malaysia.

Terminals 
At present, the two ferry terminals - one each in George Town and Butterworth - are also run by Penang Port Commission.

Major events 

31 July 1988 – The collapse of the Sultan Abdul Halim ferry terminal bridge caused 32 fatalities, while 1,674 others were wounded.
1 January 2021 – The Penang ferry service is terminated after 126 years and replaced with new fast boats.

Ferry schedule

Pangkalan Sultan Abdul Halim (Mainland Side)
Weekdays:
First ferry departure : 0630 hours
Last ferry departure : 2030 hours
Duration : 8-10mins
Weekends:
First ferry departure : 0700 hours
Last ferry departure : 2030 hours
Duration : 8-10mins

Pangkalan Raja Tun Uda (Island side)
First ferry departure : 0540 hours
Last ferry departure : 0040 hours
Duration : 15-20mins

Arrival Interval
5.20 am to 10.00p.m. : 20 – 30 minutes with 4 ferries operational
10.00 pm to 1.00a.m : 40 minutes with 1 ferry operational

Ferry rates

Pedestrian

Season ticket (pedestrians) – valid for two months from date of issue

Special passengers

Vehicles

References

External links
Photos of the Penang-Butterworth Ferries, by Peter Loud
Photos of Penang Ferry
Penang Port Sdn. Bhd.
Feri Penang
Ferry companies of Malaysia
Transport in Penang
Northern Corridor Economic Region
1894 establishments in Asia